Lord Cameron may refer to:
John Cameron, Lord Cameron (1900–1996), Scottish judge
Kenneth Cameron, Baron Cameron of Lochbroom (born 1931), Scottish judge
Ewen Cameron, Baron Cameron of Dillington (born 1949), landowner and crossbench member of the House of Lords  
Marshal of the Royal Air Force Neil Cameron, Baron Cameron of Balhousie (1920–1985), UK Chief of the Defence Staff 1977–79

See also
 Lord Fairfax of Cameron
 The White Heather, a 1919 film featuring a character Lord Angus Cameron